Juan Carlos Caballero Vega (June 24, 1900 – March 30, 2010) was a Mexican revolutionary.  Caballero worked as the personal driver and chauffeur for Mexican Revolutionary general Pancho Villa for more than two years.

References

1900 births
2010 deaths
People of the Mexican Revolution
People from Chihuahua (state)
People from Monterrey
Mexican centenarians
Men centenarians